In the United States, some state governments and legal publishers claim copyright of public laws or certain publications of public laws. It has long been established that edicts of government are not to be subject to copyright protection in the U.S., but copyright protection for the selection and arrangement of published law may remain possible, at least in some jurisdictions. The primary incentive for state governments is the ability to charge for copies of the law or legal annotations. This is a list of the hindrances to accessibility, copyright or otherwise, on the legal codes of U.S. states.

Georgia and copyright litigation

In 2015, Georgia sued activist Carl Malamud of Public.Resource.Org for distributing the Official Code of Georgia Annotated. Public.Resource.Org countersued, seeking a ruling that the works are public-domain material that is not subject to copyright, pointing out that the Official Code of Georgia Annotated is that state's only official code and constituted the authoritative source of law in the state. The district court ruled in favor of the state, but in 2018 the United States Court of Appeals for the Eleventh Circuit reversed that ruling, holding that because the Georgia Legislature had designated the material as the "official codification" of the state laws, "The resulting work is intrinsically public domain material, belonging to the People, and, as such, must be free for publication by all. As a result, no valid copyright can subsist in these works."

Oregon's dispute with Justia

In April 2008, Oregon asked Justia to remove copies of the Oregon code from its website, citing that the particular publication of the law, as distinguished by features like introductory paragraphs and page numbers, was copyrighted. Following negative media attention, the state issued a special waiver promising not to enforce the copyright against Justia or Public.Resource.org, but did not change its policies regarding the accessibility of its laws to others.

References

Law of the United States